David Merle Dalby (October 19, 1950 – August 30, 2002) was an American football  center; he played fourteen seasons in the National Football League (NFL), all with the Oakland/Los Angeles Raiders.

Early years
Dalby was a star linemen at center and defensive end, who led his high school football team, the La Serna Lancers of Whittier, California, to the California Scholastic Federation AAA football championship in 1967.  An all-around athlete in high school, Dalby also played basketball and baseball at La Serna and graduated in 1968.

Dalby played college football nearby at the University of California, Los Angeles (UCLA), where he became part of their All-Century team as center, and is a member of the UCLA Hall of Fame.

Raiders
Dalby was the 100th overall pick of the 1972 NFL Draft, selected in the fourth round by the Oakland Raiders. He played fourteen seasons in the NFL, all with the Raiders (1972–1985) and did not miss a single game.

In his fourth year in 1975, Dalby replaced hall of famer Jim Otto as the starting center, who retired after the previous season. He became only the second starting center in franchise history, as Otto had been the starter since the team's inception in 1960. For the next decade, Dalby was a part of sterling offensive lines which culminated in three Raider Super Bowl victories (XI, XV, XVIII). During that 1975–1985 window, the Raiders reached the playoffs eight times (1975–1977, 1980, 1982–1985).

During his eleven seasons as a starter, Dalby played next to hall of famer Gene Upshaw, Curt Marsh, and Charley Hannah at left guard with George Buehler and Mickey Marvin at right guard. He was selected to the Pro Bowl once, after the 1977 season. After his retirement, he was replaced as the starting center in 1986 by Don Mosebar.

Death
Dalby died in a car accident on August 30, 2002 at 51, when his van hit a tree.

References

External links

Raider starters

1950 births
2002 deaths
American Conference Pro Bowl players
American football centers
Los Angeles Raiders players
Oakland Raiders players
People from Alexandria, Minnesota
Players of American football from Minnesota
Road incident deaths in California
UCLA Bruins football players
Ed Block Courage Award recipients